Clara et les Chics Types is a 1981 French comedy drama directed by Jacques Monnet.

Plot 
In Grenoble, Mickey, Bertrand, Frederick, Charles, Louise and Aimee, united by a common love of music, form a group, the Why Notes. One day, Bertrand remarked Clara, when she fled to the church which is celebrated her marriage to a wealthy entrepreneur. A few hours later, as the band prepares to go on stage in Paris, Bertrand finds Clara who offers to fly with her and disappears ... Bertrand, completely captivated by Clara leaves the group and goes looking for her.

Cast 
 Daniel Auteuil - Mickey
 Josiane Balasko - Louise
 Christophe Bourseiller - Frédéric
 Christian Clavier - Charles
 Thierry Lhermitte - Bertrand
 Marianne Sergent - Aimée
 Isabelle Adjani - Clara
 Monique Chaumette - Louise's mother
 Antoine Bourseiller - Louise's father
 Frédérique Tirmont - Edith
 Michel Pilorgé - Edith's husband 
 Denise Noël - Frederic's mother
 Roland Giraud - Paul
 Philippe Nahon - A cop

References

External links 

1981 films
French comedy-drama films
1981 comedy-drama films
Films with screenplays by Jean-Loup Dabadie
1981 comedy films
1981 drama films
1980s French films